John Harford (by 1501 – 1559/60), of Coventry, Warwickshire, was an English Member of Parliament for Coventry in November 1554. He was Mayor of Coventry 1546–7.

References

1559 deaths
Members of Parliament for Coventry
Mayors of places in Warwickshire
English MPs 1554–1555
Year of birth uncertain